Gandhi Ghat (Hindi: गांधी घाट) is one of the main ghats on the Ganges River in Patna. It is named after the leader of the Indian independence movement Mahatma Gandhi. The ghat is famous for its Evening Ganga Aarti. It is also associated with the immersion of ashes of Mahatma Gandhi in the river Ganges.

Location
Gandhi Ghat is situated on the bank of the Ganges. It is located behind National Institute of Technology, Patna and is around 5 Kilometers North East of Patna Junction railway station.

Ganga Aarti
Ganga Aarti on Gandhi Ghat is performed with 51 lamps, by a group of priests, dressed in saffron robes. The Aarti starts with the blowing of a conch shell and continues with the movement of incense sticks in elaborate patterns and circling of large burning lamps that create a bright hue against the darkened sky. The ritual was started in 2011 on the lines of Ganga Aarti in Varanasi and Haridwar.

Tourism
Bihar State Tourism Development Corporation (BSTDC) operates MV Ganga Vihar from Gandhi Ghat. Ganga Vihar is a River Cruise ship with restaurant on-board also known as the floating restaurant. It runs Sunset Cruise and Leisure Cruise/Corporate Cruise with boarding for tourists from the ghat. Another vessel MV Kautilya was added in 2016 which is a cruise boat for tourist rides on river Ganges from Gandhi Ghat. The Tourism Department also plans to keep a floating jetty that would be placed at Gandhi Ghat, from where the two vessels operate.

Kite Festival
State tourism department organises a kite festival on the Sabbalpur diara island, across the river on the occasion of Makar Sankranti. Festival first started in 2011 and has been organised every year since then.

See also
Tourism in Patna

References

Tourist attractions in Patna
Ghats of India